Power and Participation Research Centre (PPRC) established in 1996 Is an independent non profit centre for research and social action based in Dhaka, Bangladesh. PPRC is focused on issues of public policy, knowledge management and citizen empowerment. The centre works through nurturing strong networks within grass-root and policy circles and promotes a research culture that values excellence and relevance.

Activities of the Centre encompass policy research, project evaluations, quality statistics, discourse promotion, polity advocacy, grass-roots and policy networking, and rapid response initiatives on issues of national urgency. Its founder and chairman is Hossain Zillur Rahman.

References 

Research institutes in Bangladesh
Organisations based in Dhaka
1996 establishments in Bangladesh
Bangladeshi research organisations
Bangladesh
Economic research institutes